Veysar or Visar may refer to:
 Visar, Kurdistan
 Veysar, Mazandaran